The following list shows the winners and nominees for the Billboard Music Award for Top Rap Female Artist. First given in 2018, Cardi B was the first winner and has won this award three times.

Winners and nominees

References

Billboard Music Award
Music awards honoring women